Basharatganj railway station (station code: BTG) is a railway station on the Chandausi loop of the Lucknow–Moradabad line. It is located in the town of Bisharatganj in Bareilly, Uttar Pradesh, India. The station is under the administrative control of the Moradabad Division of the Northern Railway zone of the Indian Railways.

Six trains (Five Passenger / One Express) stop at the station.

References

Moradabad railway division
Railway stations in Bareilly district